Paul Hartmann is the name of:

 Paul Ernst Wilhelm Hartmann, Norwegian politician
 Paul Hartmann (actor) (1889-1977), German actor